Batoche, Saskatchewan, which lies between  Prince Albert and Saskatoon, was the site of the historic Battle of Batoche during the North-West Rebellion of 1885. The battle resulted in the defeat of Louis Riel and his Métis forces by Major General Frederick Middleton and his Northwest Field Force. Batoche was then a small village of some 500 residents. The site has since become depopulated and now has few residents. The 1885 church building and a few other historic buildings have been preserved, and the site is a  National Historic Site.

History 

The Métis settlement of Batoche (named after Xavier Letendre dit Batoche) was established in 1872. By 1885 it numbered 500 people. The Métis of the area settled on river lots, and the community contained several stores as well as the Roman Catholic Church of St. Antoine de Padoue at the time of the Rebellion. Batoche was the de facto capital of Riel's Provisional Government of Saskatchewan.

Batoche is a Southbranch Settlement. It is situated mainly along the east bank of the South Saskatchewan River between St. Laurent and Fish Creek. This area is part of the aspen parkland biome.

This community consisted mostly of Francophones and Roman Catholics.

Batoche National Historic Site 
Batoche was declared a National Historic Site in 1923. The visitor centre features a multimedia presentation about the history of the community and its inhabitants. There are several restored buildings with costumed interpreters who depict the lifestyles of the Métis of Batoche between 1860 and 1900. The sites include a North-West Mounted Police encampment, a church and rectory complex, and a farm home. The sites are set at different locations around the community.  The complex is open from mid-May through mid-September.

In popular culture 

 In 1989, Ralph D. Witten's short story "Batoche" was read on CBC Radio by Wendell Smith

See also 
List of communities in Saskatchewan
Bell of Batoche
North-West Rebellion
Louis Riel
Gabriel Dumont

References

Further reading 
 Barnholden, Michael. (2009). Circumstances Alter Photographs: Captain James Peters' Reports from the War of 1885. Vancouver, BC: Talonbooks. .
 Dumont, Gabriel. Gabriel Dumont Speaks. Talonbooks, 2009. .
 Payment, Diane p. (2009). The Free People - Li Gens Libres University of Calgary Press. .

External links 

Batoche National Historic Site of Canada

Capitals of former nations
History museums in Saskatchewan
Living museums in Canada
Métis in Saskatchewan
Museums in Saskatchewan
National Historic Sites in Saskatchewan
Populated places on the South Saskatchewan River
St. Louis No. 431, Saskatchewan
Unincorporated communities in Saskatchewan